Anthology: 1999–2013 is the second compilation album by American rock band Underoath. It was released on November 6, 2012, via Solid State Records. The announcement of the album coincided with the band's announcement of its intention to embark on a farewell tour in 2013, and disband. Anthology: 1999–2013 features 17 songs from all seven of Underoath's studio albums, presented in reverse chronological order, including two new songs, "Sunburnt" and "Unsound". The two new songs were produced by Matt Goldman, a longtime collaborator of the band.

Track listing

Personnel

Underoath
Spencer Chamberlain – lead vocals (tracks 1–14)
Dallas Taylor – lead vocals (tracks 15–17)
Tim McTague – lead guitar, backing vocals (tracks 1–15)
Corey Steger – lead guitar, backing vocals (tracks 16–17), rhythm guitar (track 17)
James Smith – rhythm guitar (tracks 1–14)
Octavio Fernandez – rhythm guitar (tracks 15–16), bass (track 17)
Grant Brandell – bass (tracks 1–14)
William Nottke – bass (track 15)
Matt Clark – bass (track 16)
Daniel Davison – drums, percussion (tracks 1–5)
Aaron Gillespie – drums, percussion (tracks 6–17), clean vocals (tracks )
Chris Dudley – keyboards, synthesizers (tracks 1–16)

Production and recording
Matt Goldman – producer

Additional musicians
Daniel Davison – additional drums (track 6)
Jeremy Griffith – additional vocals (track 7)
John Duke – additional vocals (track 7)

References

2012 greatest hits albums
Underoath albums
Christian metal compilation albums
Post-hardcore compilation albums
Solid State Records compilation albums
Albums produced by Matt Goldman
Albums produced by Adam Dutkiewicz
Albums produced by James Paul Wisner